Mesulame Vuwai Dolokoto (born 21 January 1995) is a Fiji international rugby union player. He played for the Glasgow Warriors in the Pro14 competition.

Rugby Union career

Professional career

He also trained with the Super Rugby side Brumbies during the 2015 season.

He also represented the Fijian Drua in the 2018 National Rugby Championship.  His position of choice is hooker.

He joined Glasgow Warriors in 2019. He made his competitive debut for the club on 14 February 2020, scoring 2 tries on his debut against Zebre. He is Glasgow Warrior No. 309.

He played for the Boroughmuir Bears in the Super 6. He scored a try on his debut for the side on 19 January 2020.

He signed with Fijian Drua again in 2021.

References

External links
 

Fijian rugby union players
1995 births
Living people
Rugby union hookers
Glasgow Warriors players
Fiji international rugby union players
Boroughmuir RFC players
Fijian Drua players